Houaysae  is a village in Pak Sé District, Champasak Province, in southern Laos. It is located to the east by road of the Pakxe.Further east is Houayhe.

References

Populated places in Champasak Province